Euchaetes cressida is a moth of the family Erebidae. It was described by Harrison Gray Dyar Jr. in 1913. It is found in the US state of Texas and Mexico.

The wingspan is about 33 mm.

References

 Arctiidae genus list at Butterflies and Moths of the World of the Natural History Museum

Phaegopterina
Moths described in 1913